Blace is a town and municipality located in the Toplica District of the southern Serbia. According to 2011 census, the population of the town is 5,253, while population of the municipality is 11,754.

History 
In the Expulsion of the Albanians during 1877 and 1878, many Albanians were forced to leave Blace and its surroundings and became muhaxhirs. Settlements that Albanians left include: Alabana, Barbatovac with 17 Albanian houses, Blace with 35 Albanian houses, Gornja Draguša  with 75 Albanian houses, Donja Draguša, Mala Draguša with 64 Albanian houses, Gornje Grgure, Donje Grgure with 83 Albanian houses, Džepnica with 7 Albanian houses,  Đurevac with 3 Albanian houses,  Gornja Jošanica with 70 Albanian houses,  Donja Jošanica with 16 Albanian houses, Kačapor, Kutlovac with 35 Albanian houses,  Međuhana with 41 Albanian houses, Muzaće with 42 Albanian houses, Popova with 27 Albanian houses, Prebreza with 36 Albanian houses, Pretežana with 18 Albanian houses, Pretrešnja with 40 Albanian houses, Pridvorica with 60 Albanian houses, Čungula, Čučale with 16 Albanian houses, Rašica with 30 Albanian houses, Šiljomanja with 29 Albanian houses, Sibnica with 45 Albanian houses, Stubal with 30 Albanian houses, Suvi Do, Gornje Svarče with 35 Albanian houses, Donje Svarče with 23 Albanian houses, Trbunje with 19 Albanian houses, Vrbovac and Više Selo.

Settlements
Aside from the town of Blace, the following villages consist the municipality of Blace:

Demographics

According to the last official census done in 2011, the municipality of Blace has 11,754 inhabitants. The urban population comprises 44.7% of the municipality's population.

Ethnic groups
Most of Blace's population is of Serbian nationality (98.27%). The ethnic composition of the municipality:

Features

Every year in August, there is a 3-day festival named "Šljivijada" ("Plumday" in English); citizens of Blace consider the plum to be a very important fruit. On that day, there are many plum cultivators who show off their fruit. Many festival attendees listen to folk and other Serbian music.

Gallery

See also
 Toplica District
 Subdivisions of Serbia

References

External links

 

Populated places in Toplica District
Municipalities and cities of Southern and Eastern Serbia